Thomas Hugh Claughton (born 24 January 1996) is an English former first-class cricketer.

The son of the cricketer John Claughton, he was born at Slough in January 1996. He was educated at King Edward's School, Birmingham before going up to Magdalen College, Oxford. While studying at Oxford, he played first-class cricket on three occasions for Oxford University between 2015–19, with all three appearances coming against Cambridge University in The University Match. He scored 58 runs in these matches, with a high score of 29. His cousin, John junior, also played first-class cricket.

References

External links

1996 births
Living people
People from Slough
People educated at King Edward's School, Birmingham
Alumni of Magdalen College, Oxford
English cricketers
Oxford University cricketers